This article is about music-related events in 1880.

Specific locations
1880 in Norwegian music

Events
April 3 – Gilbert and Sullivan's comic opera The Pirates of Penzance has its London premiere at the Opera Comique on the Strand.
June 12 – Richard Strauss completes composition of his first major work, his Symphony in D minor, at age 16.
June–August – Gustav Mahler takes his first professional conducting job, in a small wooden theatre in the Austrian spa town of Bad Hall, conducting operetta.
November 1 – Mahler completes composition of Das klagende Lied.
November 27 – The Teatro Costanzi in Rome is inaugurated with a performance of Rossini's opera Semiramide.

Published popular music
 "The Beauty of Limerick" – David Braham
 "Blow the Man Down"     trad
 "Funiculì Funiculà"     w. G. Turco m. Luigi Denza
 "Keep the Horseshoe Over the Door" w. m. Joseph P. Skelly
 "Haste to the Wedding" published by Jean White
 "In The Evening By The Moonlight" w. m. James A. Bland
 "O Canada!" w. Adolphe-Basile Routhier m. Calixa Lavallée
 "Roses from the South" m. Johann Strauss II
 "Sailing, Sailing"     w.m. Godfrey Marks
 "Softly and Tenderly" w.m. Will L. Thompson
From The Pirates of Penzance, w. W. S. Gilbert m. Arthur Sullivan
"Away, Away! My Heart's On Fire"
"Now for The Pirates' Lair"
"Oh, Better Far To Live And Die"
"A Rollicking Band Of Pirates, We"
"To Gain A Brief Advantage"
"When A Felon's Not Engaged"
"When The Foeman Bares His Steel"
"When You Had Left Our Pirate Fold"
"Yes! I Am Brave! Oh, Family Descent"
"Come and meet me, Rosa darling," w. by Samuel N. Mitchell, m. by William A. Huntley

Classical music
Ján Levoslav Bella – String Quartet No. 2 in C minor
Giovanni Bottesini – Gran Duo Concertante
Johannes Brahms
Tragic Overture
Academic Festival Overture
2 Rhapsodies, Op.79, premiered January 20 in Krefeld.
Alfons Czibulka – Stephanie-Gavotte, Op.312
Felix Draeseke – Weihestunden. Six songs for baritone (or mezzo-soprano) and piano
Antonín Dvořák
Waltzes, Op.54
Violin Sonata, Op. 57 (B. 106)
Symphony No. 6 in D major, Op. 60 (B. 112)
Songs My Mother Taught Me
Gabriel Fauré – Élégie, for cello and piano
César Franck – Piano Quintet, premiered January 17
Niels Gade – Concerto for Violin and Orchestra in D minor, Op.56
Edvard Grieg – 2 Elegiac Melodies, Op.34
Emilie Mayer – Faust Overture
Ion Ivanovici – The Danube Waves
Hubert Parry – Piano Concerto
Giacomo Puccini – Messa di Gloria
Hans Rott – Symphony in E major
Camille Saint-Saëns
Suite algérienne in C major
Violin Concerto No. 3
Septet
Pablo Sarasate – Spanish Dances for violin and piano, Book III
Richard Strauss – Symphony in D minor
Pyotr Ilyich Tchaikovsky
1812 Overture
Italian Capriccio, Op.45, premiered December 18 in Moscow.
Serenade for Strings

Opera
Dudley Buck – Deseret, or A Saint's Affliction
Léo Delibes – Jean de Nivelle
Miguel Marqués – Florinda
Adolf Neuendorff – The Rat-Charmer of Hamelin/Der Rattenfänger von Hameln
 Anton Rubinstein – The Merchant Kalashnikov
George Stephănescu
Peste Dunare
Sinziana si Pepelea
Johann Strauss, Jr. – Das Spitzentuch der Königin, premiered October 10 in Vienna.

Musical theater
 La Mascotte     Paris production
 The Pirates of Penzance     London production

Published Writings 

 Alexander John Ellis – The History of Musical Pitch

Births
January 3 – Lina Abarbanell, German-American singer and actress (d. 1963)
January 5 – Nikolai Medtner, Russian pianist and composer. (d. 1951)
January 6 – John McKenna, traditional Irish flute player (d. 1947)
February 19 – Arthur Shepherd, American composer (d. 1958)
April 7 – Fritz Grünbaum, Austrian Caberet artist (murdered 1941)
June 13 – Vincent Rose, Italian-born American bandleader and composer (d. 1944)
July 5 – Jan Kubelík, Czech violinist (d. 1940)
July 24 – Ernest Bloch, Swiss-born American Jewish composer (d. 1959)
July 31 – Manuel Penella, Spanish composer (d. 1939)
September 19 – Zequinha de Abreu, Brazilian musician and composer (d. 1935)
September 20 – Ildebrando Pizzetti, Italian composer (d. 1968)
September 27 – Jacques Thibaud, French violinist (d. 1953)
October 12 – Healey Willan, English-born Canadian composer (d. 1968)
November 2 
John Foulds, English-born composer (d. 1939)
Brian Hooker, lyricist and librettist (died 1946)
Aunt Molly Jackson, American folk singer and union activist (d. 1960)

Deaths
February 18 – Christina Enbom, Swedish operatic soprano (born 1804)
March 20 – Joaquim Antônio da Silva Calado, choro composer and flautist (born 1848)
March 31 – Henryk Wieniawski, violinist and composer (born 1835) (heart attack)
May 1 – Samuel Naumbourg, composer (born 1817)
May 9 – Hermann Berens, composer (born 1826)
May 30 – James Planché, word artist (born 1796)
August 16 – Ernst Ferdinand Wenzel (born 1808)
August 17 – Ole Bull, Norwegian violinist (born 1810)
October 5 – Jacques Offenbach, composer (born 1819)
October 7 – Fredrika Stenhammar, operatic soprano (born 1836)
November 24 – Napoléon Henri Reber, composer (born 1807)
November 27 – William Saurin Lyster, opera impresario (born 1828)
December 2 – Josephine Lang, composer (born 1815)
December 27 – Alessandro Nini, composer (born 1805)
date unknown – Knut Eriksson Helland, Hardanger fiddle maker (born 1851)

References

 
19th century in music
Music by year